Double Dealing may refer to:
 Double Dealing (1923 film), an American comedy film starring Hoot Gibson
 Double Dealing (1932 film), a British film starring Frank Pettingell

See also
 Double Deal (disambiguation)
Cheating in poker
Double Dealer (disambiguation)